"Let the Music Lift You Up" is a song written by Troy Seals and Eddie Setser, and recorded by American country music artist Reba McEntire.  It was released in February 1987 as the second single from the album What Am I Gonna Do About You.  The song reached #4 on the Billboard Hot Country Singles & Tracks chart.

Chart performance

References

1987 singles
1986 songs
Reba McEntire songs
Songs written by Troy Seals
Song recordings produced by Jimmy Bowen
MCA Records singles
Songs written by Eddie Setser